Falling in Reverse is an American rock band based in Las Vegas, Nevada that formed in 2008 by lead vocalist Ronnie Radke while he was incarcerated. The band is currently led by lead vocalist Radke, alongside guitarists Max Georgiev and Christian Thompson, bassist Tyler Burgess and drummer Luke Holland, who started as a touring drummer but officially joined the band shortly after. The band was originally founded by lead vocalist Ronnie Radke and bassist Nason Schoeffler, who helped find guitarist Jacky Vincent and rhythm guitarist Derek Jones. The band has recorded four albums with five different studio lineups.

The band's first line-up started with British guitarist Jacky Vincent and A Smile From the Trenches guitarist Derek Jones, LoveHateHero drummer Scott Gee. At the beginning of April 2011, drummer Scott Gee left the band after finalizing the recordings of the debut studio album The Drug in Me Is You, he was replaced by former I Am Ghost and The Bigger Lights drummer Ryan Seaman. Days after Gee's departure, bassist Nason Schoeffler announced his departure from the band in order to be the lead singer of the band MeMyselfAlive. He was replaced by former Cellador bassist Mika Horiuchi. Despite not having participation on the album, Seaman and Horiuchi were included in the credits of their debut album The Drug in Me Is You.

In early 2012 after the release of their debut album The Drug in Me Is You, the band announced the departure of bassist Mika Horiuchi, he was replaced by former I Am Ghost bassist Ron Ficarro. In May 2014, the band announced the departure of bassist Ron Ficarro after his participation in the album Fashionably Late released in 2013, on that same day they announced that he would be replaced by former bassist and co-founder of Escape the Fate, Max Green (who had announced his departure from Escape the Fate days before after his return to the band in late 2013).

In October 2014 the band had announced the departure of bassist Max Green, the departure was friendly. On February 24, 2015 the band released their third studio album called Just Like You, it was the band's first album to be released without an official bassist. In the days of the album's release, former Black Tide bassist Zakk Sandler began playing with Falling in Reverse, later an official member announced. At the end of October 2015, the band announced the departure of guitarist Jacky Vincent, the departure was the most emotional in the band, Jacky announced his departure in order to continue his solo career. He was replaced by guitarist Christian Thompson.

In April 2017, days after the fourth studio album Coming Home was released, the departure of drummer Ryan Seaman was rumored, this was confirmed a month later when former There for Tomorrow drummer Chris Kamrada appeared performing with the band. In March 2018, in the middle of a tour of the United States, lead guitarist Christian Thompson announced that he had suffered a shoulder injury, in April of that same year he announced his departure from the band for personal reasons and he was replaced by Tyler Burgess.

On June 26, 2018, the band had released the single "Losing My Life" and their participation in the latest Vans Warped Tour, the band presented a new lineup consisting of guitarist Max Georgiev, bassist Tyler Burgess and drummer Brandon "Rage" Richter, bassist Zakk Sandler was now the keyboardist, percussionist and guitarist. In October 2018 before beginning the acoustic tour "The Roast of Ronnie Radke Tour", drummer Brandon Richter left the band without explanation. On April 8, 2019 the band released the single "Drugs", keyboardist Zakk Sandler is not shown in the music video, it was rumored that he had also left the band, this was confirmed later by Sandler, but announced that his departure was friendly.

On October 13, 2019 the band performed at the Aftershock Festival with new drummer Johnny Mele. On April 22, 2020, vocalist Ronnie Radke announced on social media the death of rhythm guitarist Derek Jones, the causes of his death are unknown. Jones was the only member after Radke to be with the band from the beginning, leaving four studio albums recorded (The Drug in Me Is You, Fashionably Late, Just Like You and Coming Home). On October 18, 2020, former guitarist Christian Thompson announced his return to the band replacing Derek Jones. At the beginning of 2021 bassist Tyler Burgess and drummer Johnny Mele left the band, this happened when Wes Horton III as the band's official bassist and Luke Holland as touring drummer in the promotional video of the band's online concert.

Official members

Current

Former

Footnotes
 "†" indicates a deceased member.

Other contributors

Touring

Session

Timeline

References

Falling in Reverse
Musicians from Las Vegas